Hemigyrus is an Asian genus of bush-crickets in the tribe Phyllomimini and the subfamily Pseudophyllinae.  Species have been recorded from: southern China and Indo-China.

Species
The Orthoptera Species File lists:
subgenus Hemigyrus Brunner von Wattenwyl, 1893
 Hemigyrus acutifolius Brunner von Wattenwyl, 1895
 Hemigyrus amplus Brunner von Wattenwyl, 1893 - type species
 Hemigyrus annamensis Gorochov & Voltshenkova, 1998
 Hemigyrus minor Gorochov & Kang, 2003
 Hemigyrus tonkinensis Beier, 1954
subgenus Tomomima Bey-Bienko, 1955
 Hemigyrus major Gorochov & Kang, 2003
 Hemigyrus sonorus Gorochov & Voltshenkova, 2001
 Hemigyrus spinosus (Bey-Bienko, 1955)

References

External links
Photo of Hemigyrus at Flickr

Tettigoniidae genera
Pseudophyllinae
Orthoptera of Asia